The 1999 Metro Atlantic Athletic Conference baseball tournament took place from May 21 through 23, 1999. The top two regular season finishers of the league's two divisions met in the double-elimination tournament held at Dutchess Stadium in Wappingers Falls, New York.  won their fourth tournament championship and earned the conference's automatic bid to the 1999 NCAA Division I baseball tournament.

Seeding 
The top two teams from each division were seeded based on their conference winning percentage. They then played a double-elimination tournament.

Results

All-Tournament Team 
The following players were named to the All-Tournament Team.

Most Valuable Player 
Dave Pahucki was named Tournament Most Valuable Player.

References 

Tournament
Metro Atlantic Athletic Conference Baseball Tournament
Metro Atlantic Athletic Conference baseball tournament